The Guerraz was a French automobile manufactured only in 1902.  A voiturette, it featured C-spring rear suspension and a 1357 cc Bolide engine the car was unreliable and that led to the downfall.

References
David Burgess Wise, The New Illustrated Encyclopedia of Automobiles.

Defunct motor vehicle manufacturers of France